Hyacinthe Gaëtan de Lannion (1719–1762) was a French politician and administrator. From 1735 to 1762 he was the Governor of Vannes in Brittany, a hereditary post he inherited from his father Anne de Lannion along with the title Count of Lannion. In 1756 following France's successful siege of the strategic British base of Minorca he was appointed Governor of Minorca a position he held until 1758 and then again between 1760 and 1762. He died in 1762, and was succeeded in his title by Emmanuel Marie Louis de Noailles.

See also
 List of Governors of Minorca
 France in the Seven Years War

1719 births
1762 deaths
French politicians